Masdevallia teaguei is a species of orchid in the genus Masdevallia. It occurs from Colombia to Ecuador.

References

External links 

teaguei
Orchids of Colombia
Orchids of Ecuador